"Tom Thumb Tempest" is the 22nd episode of Stingray, a British Supermarionation television series created by Gerry and Sylvia Anderson and produced by their company AP Films (APF) for ITC Entertainment. Written by Alan Fennell and directed by Alan Pattillo, it was first broadcast on 28 February 1965 on ATV London.

The series follows the exploits of the World Aquanaut Security Patrol (WASP), an organisation responsible for policing the Earth's oceans in the 2060s. Its flagship, Stingray, is a combat submarine crewed by Captain Troy Tempest, Lieutenant George Lee "Phones" Sheridan and Marina, a mute young woman from under the sea. Stingrays adventures bring it into contact with numerous underwater civilisations, some friendly and others hostile, as well as strange natural phenomena.

In "Tom Thumb Tempest", Troy has a nightmare in which Stingray and its crew are miniaturised. The use of life-sized sets to convey the shrinking of the puppet characters has attracted a mixed response from commentators.

Plot
The Stingray crew are relaxing in the Marineville standby lounge when Commander Shore (voiced by Ray Barrett) orders them to prepare to launch, warning them of a dangerous mission. Captain Troy Tempest (voiced by Don Mason) is eager to leave immediately but Shore tells him to await further instructions. Troy's attention turns to the fish in the lounge aquarium. He then falls asleep in his chair.

Troy wakes to hear Shore on the intercom, ordering the crew to launch. He leaves in Stingray with Phones (voiced by Robert Easton) and Marina. Shore radios in, ordering Troy to pilot Stingray through an undersea tunnel. Troy asks for details of the mission but Shore gruffly denies his request, leaving Troy feeling belittled.

Stingray exits the tunnel and hits a sheet of glass. The crew are astonished to find that they have been miniaturised and ended up inside an aquarium within a giant dining room. Leaving Stingray on their hovering monocopters, they investigate the dining table, which has been set for various undersea villains. At the head of the table, set for King Titan of Titanica, is a schematic of Marineville's defence systems. The crew realise that they have stumbled across a gathering of the undersea races to plot the destruction of Marineville.

The crew hide as an Aquaphibian dressed as a waiter enters the room to check the table. They then use a nearby telephone to call Marineville. Shore answers and Troy explains the situation, but the commander thinks that Troy is joking and ends the call. The crew again take cover as the Aquaphibian returns with Titan's agent X-2-Zero (voiced by Robert Easton), who notices the mess the crew have made of the table and reprimands the Aquaphibian for what he assumes to be poor table-setting. The Aquaphibian tidies up.

Left alone, the crew destroy the schematic by pouring alcohol on it and setting it alight. The fire quickly engulfs the room, forcing them back to Stingray. As the aquarium boils, Troy realises that Stingray is trapped. He orders Phones to break the glass with a torpedo, hoping that the escaping water will put out the fire.

As the torpedo is fired, Troy wakes to find himself back in the lounge. Shore tells the crew to stand down and Troy, realising that he has had a nightmare, apologises to the commander for his impatience.

Production
"Tom Thumb Tempest" was significant for combining -scale Supermarionation puppets with a life-sized dining room set. It was not the first episode of a Supermarionation series to deal with miniaturised characters: the idea had previously been explored in Supercars "Calling Charlie Queen" and Fireball XL5s "The Triads". However, whereas those episodes had used back projection for their miniaturisation effects, "Tom Thumb Tempest" presented its "shrunken" characters on a physical set. Stephen La Rivière cites "Tom Thumb Tempest" as another example of the "Land of Giants-type" episode that APF had attempted in its previous two series.

Reception
Gerry Anderson biographers Simon Archer and Marcus Hearn consider "Tom Thumb Tempest" to be one of Stingrays most entertaining episodes. TV Zone names it the worst of the series, calling the ending "reasonably clever" but the episode overall a "wasted opportunity". The magazine argues that the episode is spoiled through its use of "two hoary old clichés – the 'incredible shrinking cast' idea ... and the 'it was all a dream' cop-out ending" – the first of which merely emphasises the "unreality" of the plot while the second renders the episode "entirely inconsequential". The magazine also criticises the dream sequence itself for being insufficiently surreal and "[degenerating] into sub-Tom and Jerry shenanigans" towards the end.

Jim Sangster and Paul Condon, authors of Collins Telly Guide, describe the episode as "decidedly less aimed at realism" than those of later Supermarionation series. They also refer to dream sequences as "one of Anderson's most annoying recurring plot devices".

La Rivière suggests that the "tantalising glimpse of reality" provided by the episode conflicted with APF's ongoing efforts to make its puppet characters seem more human. Ian Fryer regards the episode as a precursor of the final Supermarionation series, The Secret Service, which featured both puppets and live actors.

References

Works cited

External links

1965 British television episodes
Fiction about size change
Science fiction television episodes
Stingray (1964 TV series)
Television episodes about nightmares
Television episodes set on fictional islands